Jack Williams was the name of two Old West outlaws. The first was hanged and the second, upon his appearance, became known as Jack William's Ghost or The Ghost Robber.

References

People of the American Old West
American robbers
People executed by the United States by hanging